Vasily Vasilovich Davydov (31 August 1930 – 19 March 1998) was a Russian psychologist who led the Psychological Institute of the Russian Academy of Education.

In 1958 he joined Georgy Shchedrovitsky in founding the Commission for The Study of The Psychology of Thought and Logic

In the 1980s he was Director  of  the  Institute  of  General  and Pedagogical Psychology in Moscow. Here he established a 'laboratory' 
where Felix Mikhailov, Vladimir Bibler, A.S. Arsen'ev and Georgy Shchedrovitsky. In 1983 he was removed from the institute and the laboratory was dissolved.

References

External links
 article about Davydov by Dr Keith Devlin (a.k.a.  NPR's The Math Guy)

1930 births
Psychologists from Moscow
Russian educational theorists
1998 deaths
Soviet psychologists
Soviet educational theorists
20th-century psychologists